Andrakovo is a rural locality (a village) in Ustyuzhenskoye Rural Settlement, Ustyuzhensky District, Vologda Oblast, Russia. The population was 4 as of 2002.

Geography 
Borovinka is the nearest rural locality.

References 

Rural localities in Ustyuzhensky District